The coat of arms of Jakarta is the official symbol of Jakarta, the capital of Indonesia. The coat of arms depicts the National Monument and a gold-and-white paddy and cotton.

History

Dutch East Indies 

Prior to the independence of Indonesia, Jakarta was named Batavia. The first coat of arms of Batavia was officially adopted on 8 February 1911. The arms consisted of a red shield with a blue sword surrounded by a brown laurel wreath, supported by lions holding a sword and arrow, above the arms was a normal city crown, and the motto Ende Dispereert Niet. The motto was derived from the arms of the Coen family: Ende Dispereert Niet (And do not surrender).

On 14 January 1929, the color of the shield was changed into orange. A major change to the coat of arms occurred on 22 January 1930, with the shape of the shield being changed, the supporting lions were actually supporting the shield, the crown was changed into a normal city crown and the motto shortened to Dispereert Niet (Don't surrender).

The coat of arms was used until 7 March 1942, when the Japanese forces officially occupied Batavia.

Japanese occupation 
During the Japanese occupation, there was no recorded use of any coat of arms.

Indonesian National Revolution 
After the independence of Indonesia, Jakarta was officially designated as the capital of Indonesia. There was no recorded use of any coat of arms.

On 21 July 1947, during the Operation Product, the Dutch occupied Jakarta. The government of Jakarta was dissolved, and Suwiryo, the mayor of Jakarta, was arrested. Jakarta was renamed to Batavia and the old coat of arms was readopted.

Batavia was renamed again to Jakarta after the sovereignty recognition of Indonesia on 27 December 1949. The Batavian coat of arms was not used anymore.

First coat of arms (1951-1963) 

After the sovereignty recognition of Indonesia, Jakarta became the capital of Indonesia again. Suwiryo was re-installed as the mayor of Jakarta, and on 10 September 1950, Suwiryo announced a contest for the coat of arms of Jakarta. A commission was formed for the contest, consisted of Professor Poerbatjaraka, G. A. Soekirno and J. E. Lefeber. A total of 111 works were submitted by various artists from all over Indonesia.

The commission decided to use the work of the artist Djajamarta, with several changes, as the coat of arms of Jakarta. On 30 August 1951, with the Decree of the Minister of Internal Affairs No. 45/1/6, the coat of arms was officially adopted.

Second coat of arms (1963-now) 

After the construction of the obelisk of the National Monument was finished in 1963, Sukarno instructed the Governor of Jakarta, Soemarno Sosroatmodjo, to include the monument in the coat of arms of Jakarta. A new coat of arms was commissioned, and the coat of arms was officially adopted on 26 June 1963.

The motto, which was written in the old spelling (Djaja Raja), was officially replaced with the new spelling (Jaya Raya) on 15 July 1964.

Use in football 
Jakarta association football club Persija adopted the emblem of Jakarta as a club insignia. Governor Soediro granted the permission for using the coat of arms. Initially the 1951 coat of arms, but it was revised as Jakarta had used the 1963/64 emblem.

Notes

References

Bibliography 

Jakarta
Jakarta
Jakarta
Jakarta